Norwalk City School District is a public school district serving students in the city of Norwalk, parts of Bronson Township, and Norwalk Township in Huron County, Ohio, United States. The school district enrolls 2,859 students as of the 2007-2008 academic year.

School Facilities
The school district has 8 schools, six of which are public, two are private.  The current clustering of grades in certain buildings began with the 2011-2012 school year.

Maplehurst Elementary School (Pre-K to 1st Grade)

Maplehurst Elementary is located at 195 St. Mary's Street and serves students in pre-school, Kindergarten and 1st grade. 
 
Maplehurst was built in 1953.

Pleasant Elementary School (2nd & 3rd Grade)

Pleasant Elementary is located at 16 S. Pleasant Street and serves students in 2nd and 3rd grade.

The original Pleasant was built in 1867 at a cost of $13,035.79.  This building was later demolished.

League Elementary School (4th Grade)

League Elementary is located at 16 League Street and serves students in 4th grade.

The original League Street School was built around 1872 and demolished in 1912-1913.

Main Street Intermediate School (5th & 6th Grade)

Main Street Intermediate is located at 80 E. Main Street and serves students in 5th and 6th grade.  This school once was the high school, but became the intermediate school when the new high school was finished being built in 2001.

Norwalk Middle School (7th & 8th Grade)

Norwalk Middle School is located at 64 Christie Avenue and serves students in 7th and 8th grade.

Norwalk High School (9th-12th Grade)

Norwalk High School is located at 350 Shady Lane and serves students in grades 9-12.
Norwalk High has been accredited with North Central Association since 1912 and is also a member of the Sandusky Bay Conference (SBC) for athletic competition.

Former buildings

Benedict School at 134 Benedict Avenue is now home of the Board of Education offices.  It was closed in either 1980 or 1981 along with Bronson-Norwalk.  In the 1970s, NCSD tried grade "clustering" in their system and paired Benedict with Bronson-Norwalk.  Benedict would house grades K-3 and then send those students to Bronson-Norwalk for 4-6.  The same was done with League (K-3) and Pleasant (4-6), while Maplehurst housed K-6 during this time.
Bronson-Norwalk Township School used to stand at 66 Townline Road 151. It was also closed in 1981 after 43 years of service. The Norwalk Virus (aka Noroviros) was named after an outbreak here in 1968.
Hester Street School

Technology

The Norwalk High School One-to-One project has been developed over several years focusing on a specific class and providing additional training for that instructor. The project involves using a tablet computer (iPad) which allows students and staff the opportunity to enter information with the conventional keyboard or with an active stylus that allows students to write or ink their work much like a piece of paper and a pencil. Because of this, physical materials such as pens, paper, and textbooks are no longer required.

The following classes use this program:
English IV,
AP English,
Honors English III,
English III,
Honors English II,
Anatomy and Physiology,
AP American History,
US Gov't & Economics,
Senior Social Studies,
AP Psychology,
AP Government and Politics,
Teen Leadership Corps.,
Spanish IV and V,
AP Calculus,
AP Computer,
Precalculus,
Trigonometry,
Statistics,
Honors Algebra II,
Algebra II,
Physics,
Environmental Science,
Physics,
Chemistry,
Biology,
and Principles of Engineering,
OR any other Honors Class, Junior Class, or Senior Class NOT listed.

References

[1] http://norwalk-city.k12.oh.us/

External links
Norwalk City School District

School districts in Ohio
Education in Huron County, Ohio